Jiří Veselý was the defending champion, but decided not to compete.

Andrey Kuznetsov won the title, defeating Miloslav Mečíř Jr. in the final, 2–6, 6–3, 6–0.

Seeds

Draw

Finals

Top half

Bottom half

References
 Main Draw
 Qualifying Draw

Prosperita Openandnbsp;- Singles
2014 Singles